Paudash (Paudash Lake) Water Aerodrome  is an aerodrome located on Lower Paudash Lake,  southwest of Paudash, Ontario, Canada.

References

Registered aerodromes in Ontario
Seaplane bases in Ontario
Buildings and structures in Hastings County